Dwight "Bo" Lamar (born April 7, 1951) is a former professional American basketball player. Born and raised  in Columbus, Ohio, he graduated from the University of Southwestern Louisiana, now the University of Louisiana at Lafayette. Lamar was a leading NCAA scorer and was the No. 1 overall pick in the 1973 American Basketball Association Draft.

College career
A graduate of East High School in Columbus, Ohio, Lamar attended Southwestern Louisiana, who transitioned to Division I in 1971-1972. Lamar didn’t even average 20 points per game as a senior in high school, playing alongside friend and teammate Ed Ratleff, but Southwestern Louisiana coach Beryl Shipley made him the focus of the SLA offense, with free rein to shoot. averaging 22.8 to earn “Freshman of the Year” in the Gulf States Conference. Eventually, the basketball program was given a two year death penalty by the NCAA during Lamar's senior season, that went into effect the next season.

Lamar was a three-time collegiate All-American between 1969–1973, and was named First team All-America in 1972 and 1973 along with Bill Walton, David Thompson and Ernie DiGregorio. During his college career he averaged 31.2 points a game, a point total of 3,493 points, which remains among the top ranks of NCAA basketball. He is known for his extremely high long-range shot that some coaches say dusted the rafters.

“Bo Lamar is the purest shooter I’ve ever seen,” said Hall of Fame Coach Jerry Tarkanian.

“If there had been a three-point shot in those days, he would’ve averaged 50 points a game,” Coach Beryl Shipley said.

Lamar led the Ragin’ Cajuns to a 90-23 record in his four seasons. Their record his last three seasons was 74-13, bettered only by UCLA during that span.

Professional career
Lamar was a third-round pick by the Detroit Pistons in the 1973 NBA Draft. He was the top overall pick in the 1973 American Basketball Association Draft by the San Diego Conquistadors and signed with them.

As a rookie in 1973-1974, Lamar averaged 20.4 points per game for San Diego and made the ABA All-Rookie team, playing for Coach Wilt Chamberlain. He also set the franchise record, scoring 50 points in one game.

Lamar averaged 20.9 points per game in 1974-1975, being reunited with his college coach Beryl Shipley, during the season. After averaging 16.0 in his third season, he ended up playing sparingly for the Lakers in 1976-1977, the final year of his career. Lamar was released by the Lakers after the season.

He played for three American Basketball Association teams: the San Diego Conquistadors (1973–1975), the rebranded San Diego Sails (1975) (who folded after 11 games) and the Indiana Pacers (1975-1976) before moving to the NBA after the ABA–NBA merger. In 1976-1977 Lamar played 71 games for the Los Angeles Lakers.
Overall, Lamar averaged 16.4 points and 3.9 assists in 273 career games. His ABA averages were 19.7 points and 4.4 assists in 202 games.

Personal
Lamar was the  Louisiana-Lafayette basketball color analyst on radio, before retiring to his native Ohio.

Honors
 Lamar was inducted into the UL Athletics Hall of Fame.
 One media list ranked Lamar in the Top 100 players in the history of NCAA basketball (#64).
 In 1984, Lamar was inducted into the Louisiana Sports Hall of Fame.
 In 2018, Lamar was selected for induction into the OHSAA’s Circle of Champions by the Ohio State High School Athletic Association.

References

External links
 https://www.sports-reference.com/cbb/players/dwight-lamar-1.html
 https://www.basketball-reference.com/players/l/lamarbo01.html

1951 births
Living people
African-American basketball players
All-American college men's basketball players
American men's basketball players
Basketball players from Columbus, Ohio
Detroit Pistons draft picks
Indiana Pacers players
Los Angeles Lakers players
Louisiana Ragin' Cajuns men's basketball players
Point guards
San Diego Conquistadors players
San Diego Sails players
21st-century African-American people
20th-century African-American sportspeople